The Scottish Rally Championship is a rallying series run throughout Scotland over the course of a year, that comprises seven gravel rallies and one tarmac event. Points are awarded to the top placed drivers and the driver scoring the highest number of points over the season is declared Champion

The 2011 season begins in the snow-covered forest tracks around Inverness on 19 February, with the season finale taking place around Aberfeldy on 1 October. 2011 sees the commencement of a two-year partnership with leading motorsport tyre manufacture, DMACK Tyres.

David Bogie began the year as defending champion after winning six out of the eight events in 2010.

Following the Speyside stages in August, David Bogie was declared champion for the third successive year despite there being two events remaining. A magnificent 4 wins out of 6 events so far means that, due to the SRC nominate 6 best results out of 8 rule, he is uncatchable in the title race.

2011 Calendar
In season 2011, as in 2010, there will be 8 events held on a variety of surfaces.

2011 Results

Drivers Points Classification

Points are awarded to the highest placed registered driver on each event as follows: 30, 28, 27, 26, and so on down to 1 point. 
At the end of the Championship, competitors will count their best 6 scores out of 8 events as his/her final overall Championship score.

References

External links
 Scottish Rally Championship Homepage
 RSAC Scottish Rally Homepage

Scottish Rally Championship seasons
Scottish Rally Championship
Scottish